The 1971 New York City Marathon was the 2nd edition of the New York City Marathon and took place in New York City on 19 September.

Results

Men

Women

References

External links

New York City
Marathon
New York City Marathon
New York City Marathon